Pakur (previously known as Pakaur) is a town with a nagar palika in the Pakur subdivision of the Pakur district, Jharkhand state, India.

History
Pakur was earlier a Sub-Division of Santhal Parganas district of Bihar. It was upgraded to the status of district on 28 January 1994. Upon reorganization of Bihar state, India, in 2000 into two separate states, namely, Bihar and Jharkhand, Pakur district came under the administrative control of the Jharkhand state.

Geography

Location
Pakur is located at 

Overview
Rajmahal coalfield is shown in the map. The entire area is overwhelmingly rural with only small pockets of urbanisation.

Note: The full screen map is interesting. All places marked on the map are linked and you can easily move on to another page of your choice. Enlarge the map to see what else is there – one gets railway links, many more road links and so on.

Demographics

According to the 2011 Census of India, Pakur had a total population of 45,840, of which 23,653 (52%) were males and 22,167 (48%) were females. Population in the age range 0–6 years was 6,352. The total number of literate persons in Pakur was 39,488 (77.60% of the population over 6 years).

Infrastructure
According to the District Census Handbook 2011, Pakur, Pakur covered an area of 11.08 km2. Among the civic amenities, it had 34.2 km roads with open drains, the protected water supply involved hand pump, tap water from untreated sources, overhead tanks. It had 7,704 domestic electric connections, 443 road light points. Among the medical facilities, it had 4 hospitals, 2 dispensaries, 2 health centres, 1 family welfare centre, 1 maternity and child welfare centre, 1 maternity home, 1 TB hospital/ clinic, 2 nursing homes, 1 charitable hospital/ nursing home, 1 veterinary hospital, 26 medicine shops. Among the educational facilities it had 33 primary schools, 19 middle schools, 4 secondary schools, 4 senior secondary schools, 1 general degree college, 2 recognised shorthand typewriting and vocational training institutions, 1 non-formal education centre (Sarva Shiksha Abhiyan). Among the social, cultural and recreational facilities, it had 2 stadiums, 2 cinema theatres, 5 auditorium/ community halls, 1 public library, 1 reading room. Three important commodities it manufactured were bidi, stone crusher machine, bakery products. It had the branch offices of 11 nationalised banks, 1 private commercial bank, 1 cooperative bank, 3 agricultural credit societies.

Economy
One of the main businesses of the city is mining and crushing. It is also known for the manufacturing of crushing and screening equipments. Pakur is also the place where the first indigenous Jaw Crusher was manufactured by Bhagwati Prasad Agarwalla.

Since last decade there has been an enormous activity of coal excavation in the area as well. It has one of the biggest reserves of coal in the world. Currently only one block of coal is active in the region. It has been allotted to the Punjab State Government for their captive Thermal Power Plants. The excavation work on behalf of the Punjab State Government is being done by Panem, a public–private joint venture between the Punjab State Electricity Board and EMTA.

Transport
Pakur Railway Station is located on the Sahibganj Loop.

Education
Pakur has educational institutions offering all levels of education, including Pakur Raj High School (Estd. 1852) and Kumar Kalidas Memorial College. and 2 jawahar Navodaya vidyalaya Get +2level education

Pakur has now Polytechnic Institute -Owned by Deptt. of Higher, Technical Education and Skill Development, Govt. of Jharkhand run and Manage in PPP Mode by M/s Cybobhubaneswar Educational Foundation. The Polytechnic Institute is approved by AICTE and SBTE.At present with Five Streams (Civil, Electrical, Metallurgy, Mining and Mechanical) total 300 Seats are available out of which 240 for Jharkhand Students and 60 for other states. The Polytechnic is spread in 7.1 Acres with more than 2.0 Lakhs built up area with all amenities(Including Boys and Girls Hostel).

References

External links
 Pakur District Administration

Cities and towns in Pakur district